Geçerli, historically Kumsurun, is a village in the Elbeyli District, Kilis Province, Turkey. The village is inhabited by Abdals of the Kurular tribe and had a population of 159 in 2022.

References

Villages in Elbeyli District